This is a timeline documenting the events of heavy metal in the year 1973.

Newly formed bands 
 AC/DC
Ace Frehley
 Bachman-Turner Overdrive
 Bad Company
 Cheap Trick
 The Dictators
Edda Művek
Journey 
 JPT Scare Band
Kaipa
Kansas 
 Kiss
Lazy 
 Max Webster
 Montrose
 Primevil
 Quiet Riot
Stray Dog
 Vardis
Vitacit
 Witchfynde

Reformed bands 
 Mountain

Albums

January

February

March

May

July

August

September

October

November

Unknown 
 Budgie - Never Turn Your Back On a Friend

Disbandments

Events 
 Vocalist Rob Halford replaces Al Atkins in Judas Priest.
 Vocalist Ian Gillan quits Deep Purple, as does Roger Glover. They are replaced by David Coverdale and Glenn Hughes, respectively.
 Lou Reed is bitten by a fan during a concert in Buffalo, New York
 Leon Russell punched in the face during a concert in Springfield Illinois

References 

1970s in heavy metal music
Metal